The Olympus Tough TG-4 is a weatherised digital compact camera announced by Olympus Corporation on April 13, 2015. It differs from its predecessor, the Olympus Tough TG-3, by including raw image recording.

Other than its new RAW capability, the TG-4 is technically very similar to the Olympus TG-3. The physical dimensions (length x width x depth) of the TG-3 and the TG-4 are identical. 

In 2015, for the USA market, the MSRP for the older TG-3 is listed at $349 vs. $379 for the newer TG-4. The camera was superseded by the Olympus Tough TG-5 in May 2017.

References
Olympus Tough TG-4: Digital Photography Review

External links 
 

Olympus digital cameras
Cameras introduced in 2015